Patkhor Peak is a mountain in Tajikistan's Gorno-Badakhshan Autonomous Province. At  it is the highest point in the Rushan Range, a subrange of the Pamir Mountains.

References

 Atlas of the Soviet Republics of Central Asia, Moscow, 1988, p. 52.

External links
 Rushan Range in Big Soviet Encyclopedia, on-line edition .

See also
List of Ultras of Central Asia

Mountains of Tajikistan
Six-thousanders of the Pamir